The 2011 Yas V8 400 was a motor race for the Australian sedan-based V8 Supercars. It was the first race of the 2011 International V8 Supercars Championship. It was held on the weekend of 10–12 February at the Yas Marina Circuit, in Abu Dhabi, United Arab Emirates. It was the second time V8 Supercar visited the circuit.

The weekend's race victories were shared between 2008 and 2009 champion Jamie Whincup of Triple Eight Race Engineering and 2010 champion James Courtney, who made his début with Holden Racing Team, having moved from Dick Johnson Racing over the off-season. Whincup took the championship lead after following up his race one victory, with third place behind Courtney and Brad Jones Racing's Jason Bright in race two. Despite winning the second race, Courtney trailed Whincup by 152 points after the weekend, after being docked 50 points for careless driving in race one. Stone Brothers Racing drivers Alex Davison equalled his best result in the series, matching his second-place finish at the Darwin round in 2009, in race one. Davison's seventh-place finish in the second race was enough for him to end the weekend second in points. Team-mate Shane van Gisbergen also finished both races in the top ten, with his fourth and eighth places enough to place him third in points.

Results
Results as follows:

Race 1

Qualifying

Race 
Race timesheets:

Race 2

Qualifying

Race

Standings
 After 2 of 28 races.

See also 
 2011 Yas Marina Circuit GP2 Asia Series round

References

External links
Yas V8 400 website
Official timing and results

Yas
Yas V8 400
Motorsport competitions in the United Arab Emirates